Harold Lane may refer to:

Harold Lane (rower) (1895–1972), British rower
Harold Lane (Canadian politician) (born 1945), Canadian provincial politician
Harold Lane (Kansas politician), member of the Kansas House of Representatives

See also
Harry Lane (disambiguation)